Martin Dugas (born 15 October 1972) is a Canadian former soccer player who spent a total of 12 years as a professional. He last coaches the Edmonton Drillers.

Career

Club career
Dugas was an OUA soccer West Division All-Star in 1991 playing for McMaster University.

Dugas played for hometown side St. Catharines Wolves before joining Dutch club SC Cambuur. Had brief stints with FC St. Pauli in Germany and Watford in England (although he never made a first-team league appearance with the Hornets.) In the fall of a 1996, he returned to Canada where he signed with the Edmonton Drillers of the National Professional Soccer League. He would spend most of the rest of his career playing outdoor soccer during the summer and indoor soccer during the winter. He would play for the Driller until the start of the 2000–2001 NPSL season. That year, he began the season in Edmonton until traded to the Detroit Rockers after nine games. He finished the season with Detroit, then played from 2001 to 2003 with the Milwaukee Wave. In 2003, the Monterrey Fury selected Dugas in the NPSL Expansion Draft, then traded him to the Dallas Sidekicks for the 2003–2004 indoor season. He also played for the Toronto Lynx through the 1998 season USISL season. In May 1999, he signed with the Staten Island Vipers in the USL A-League. The Vipers folded at the end of the season. He then played for the Montreal Impact in 2001 USL A-League. In 2002, he played for the Calgary Storm, also in the USL A-League. In 2007 moved then to Edmonton Drillers and signed a contract as Player-Coach.

International career
Dugas was an unused substitute for Canada at the 1996 CONCACAF Gold Cup.

Coaching career
Dugas working as head coach of the 2008–09 CMISL Edmonton Drillers and was in January 2010 replaces by Kevin Poissant.

Personal life
Dugas has an Irish passport which he qualifies for through his mother.

References

External links
OUA.ca.ismmedia.com
Dutch career stats – Voetbal International

1971 births
Living people
Calgary Storm players
Canadian expatriate sportspeople in the United States
Canadian expatriate soccer players
Canadian expatriate sportspeople in Germany
Canadian expatriate sportspeople in the Netherlands
Canadian soccer coaches
Canadian soccer players
Citizens of Ireland through descent
Dallas Sidekicks (2001–2008 MISL) players
Detroit Rockers players
Edmonton Drillers (2007) players
Edmonton Drillers (1996–2000) players
Eerste Divisie players
Expatriate footballers in England
Expatriate footballers in Germany
Expatriate footballers in the Netherlands
Association football midfielders
Hershey Wildcats players
Canadian people of Irish descent
Major Indoor Soccer League (2001–2008) players
McMaster University alumni
Milwaukee Wave players
Montreal Impact (1992–2011) players
National Professional Soccer League (1984–2001) players
SC Cambuur players
Soccer people from Ontario
St. Catharines Roma Wolves players
Sportspeople from St. Catharines
Staten Island Vipers players
Toronto Lynx players
USISL players
A-League (1995–2004) players
Watford F.C. players
1996 CONCACAF Gold Cup players
Canadian National Soccer League players
Canadian expatriate sportspeople in England
Player-coaches